Tha Eimai Edo (Greek: Θα Είμαι Εδώ; English: I will be here) is the fifth studio album by popular Greek singer Nikos Oikonomopoulos, released on 12 December 2011 by Minos EMI. The first song "Kai Ti Egine" was written by Phoebus.

Track listing
"Kai Ti Egine" (Και Τι Έγινε; So What) - 3:41
"Tha Eima Edo" (Θα Είμαι Εδώ; I Will Be Here) – 4:01
"Kali Kardia" (Καλή Καρδιά; Good Heart) - 3:53
"Me Peirazei" (Με Πειράζει; It Bothers Me) - 4:24
"Devterolepta Tha Meino" (Δευτερόλεπτα Θα Μείνω; Two Seconds Will I Stay) - 3:36
"Irthe I Ora Na Figo" (Ήρθε Η Ώρα Να Φύγω; It's Time To I Leave) - 4:17
"Poia Zoi Na Ziso" (Ποια Ζωή Να Ζήσω; What Life To Live) - 4:16
"Pou Tha Me Pas" (Που Θα Με Πας; Where Will You Take Me) - 3:48
"Psaxe Me" (Ψάξε Με; Search Me) - 4:08
"Ola Plironontai Edo" (Όλα Πληρώνονται Εδώ; All Pay Here) - 3:32
"Hanomaste" (Χανόμαστε; We Are Lost) - 3:24
"Exartimenos" (Εξαρτημένος; Addicted) - 3:07
"Matosa Gia Sena" (Μάτωσα Για Σένα; Bleed For You) - 4:08
"Poutana Stin Psihi" (Πουτάνα Στην Ψυχή; Whore In Soul) - 4:26

Chart performance 

The album was certified double platinum for one week. In 2012 was certified four times platinum.

References

2011 albums
Nikos Oikonomopoulos albums
Greek-language albums
Minos EMI albums